The name Innis has been used for two tropical cyclones in the Southwestern Pacific Ocean:

Cyclone Innis (1992), which briefly threatened Vanuatu
Cyclone Innis (2009), a weak cyclone that crossed Vanuatu, New Caledonia, and New Zealand.

Australian region cyclone set index articles
South Pacific cyclone set index articles